Dino Radončić (Cyrillic: Дино Радончић; born 8 January 1999) is a Montenegrin professional basketball player for Casademont Zaragoza of the Liga ACB.

Early life
Radončić was born in Germany, where his father, Damir Radončić, played professional handball. During his childhood, he also spent some time in Spain, where his father had signed with a club, before the family settled in Zrenjanin, Serbia, when he was eight years of age. Radončić started playing football, before turning to basketball, in the youth system of KK Uno Grande Zrenjanin.

Professional career
In the 2013–14 season, Radončić played with the youth ranks of FC Barcelona. He moved to Real Madrid's youth teams one year later, for the 2014–15 season. He then played with Real Madrid's reserve team, Real Madrid B, in the 2015–16 season.

He also made his Spanish Liga ACB and EuroLeague debuts with Real Madrid's senior men's team, during the 2015–16 season. In the 2016–17 season, he also split playing time between Real Madrid's main team, and their reserve B team.

On 8 August 2018 Real Madrid loaned him to San Pablo Burgos for the 2018–19 season.

On July 25, 2019, Radončić part ways with Real Madrid and signed a two-year deal with UCAM Murcia. On February 25, 2020, he parted ways with UCAM Murcia. One day later, he signed with Iberostar Tenerife of the Liga ACB.

On August 11, 2020, he signed with Casademont Zaragoza.

International career
Radončić had his first cap for the senior Montenegrin national basketball team in 2016, while playing in the EuroBasket 2017 qualifiers. He also played with Montenegro at the main EuroBasket 2017 tournament.

Career statistics

EuroLeague

|-
| style="text-align:left;"| 2015–16
| style="text-align:left;" rowspan=2| Real Madrid
| 1 || 0 || 2.4 || .000 || .000 || .500 || 0.0 || 0.0 || 0.0 || 0.0 || 1.0 || -1.0
|-
| style="text-align:left;background:#AFE6BA;"| 2017–18†
| 7 || 2|| 6.2 || .667 || .167 || .000 || 0.4 || 0.1 || 0.1 || 0.0 || 1.0 || -0.1
|- class="sortbottom"
| colspan="2" style="text-align:center;"| Career
| 8 || 2 || 6.3 -|| .500 || .167 || .500 || 0.4 || 0.1 || 0.1 || 0.0 || 1.0 || -0.2

See also
List of youngest EuroLeague players

References

External links
Dino Radončić at euroleague.net
Dino Radončić at fiba.com (archive)
Dino Radončić at eurobasket.com
Dino Radončić at acb.com 

1999 births
Living people
2019 FIBA Basketball World Cup players
Basket Zaragoza players
CB Miraflores players
CB Murcia players
Gipuzkoa Basket players
Liga ACB players
Montenegrin expatriate basketball people in Spain
Montenegrin men's basketball players
Sportspeople from Giessen
Power forwards (basketball)
Real Madrid Baloncesto players
Small forwards